Cape Ward Hunt is a cape on the north coast of Oro Province, Papua New Guinea. The cape was named after George Ward Hunt, First Lord of the Admiralty (1874-1877), by Captain John Moresby.

The waters lying between Cape Ward Hunt and Cape Nelson about  distant are described as being:
of the most dangerous character, due to the unsurveyed areas and the numerous coral patches and shoals. The coral patches are steep-to and the sea seldom breaks on
them. The weather is often thick with passing squalls of rain, and anchorages are rare close to land. Between coral patches only a few miles apart [half-dozen km], a sounding of several hundred meters [] may be obtained.

A radar of the Royal Australian Air Force manned by No. 315 Radar Station RAAF was located upon Cape Ward Hunt from 12 April 1943 until 4 October 1944 during World War II.

References

References cited

Ward Hunt
Oro Province